Dov Eichenwald (born November 7, 1955) is CEO and publisher of Yedioth Books and editor-in-chief of the publishing house.

Biography 
Dov Eichenwald is the son of Abraham Zvi, a Holocaust survivor who survived Auschwitz, and Sarah (Haltovsky) who was born in Jerusalem. He grew up in Bnei Brak, attended  Haroeh high school in Ramat Gan, and served in the IDF as an  investigating officer in the Army's military police. Following his release he began to study for a BA at Bar Ilan University but did not finish due to a serious injury he suffered  while serving as a reserve commander during the 1982 Lebanon War. In the aftermath of the Tyre headquarters bombings, Eichenwald was trapped under rubble for nine hours and was rescued in serious condition.

Since childhood, Eichenwaldhelped his father operate the family business 'Hemed Books', a small independent publishing house specializing in non-fiction literature, and as an adult he joined the management. In 1994 a partnership was formed between 'Hemed Books' and Yedioth Ahronoth thus founding 'Miscal - Publishing' known today as Yedioth Books. Eichenwald serves as CEO of the publishing house ever since.

Eichenwald is remarried to Tali Eichenwald-Dvir, vice dean of the Arison School of Business at IDC Herzliya, and they live in Givat Shmuel. They have eight children.

References

External links 
 Shiri Lev-Ari, Man About the House Haaretz  June 29, 2005 
 דובי איכנולד, צור 1982. הייתי קבור בגיהנום, ynet  26 באוקטובר 2012
 דובי איכנולד, בלב השקט המהדהד העמדנו את אלוהים למשפט,  ynet  25 באפריל 2014
 דובי איכנולד, מפגש עם הבן בממלכת הפחד והחרדה בדרום,  ynet  3 באוגוסט 2014
 דובי איכנולד, אחים להלם,  ynet  31 בספטמבר 2013

Living people
Israeli publishers (people)
1955 births